Guglielmo della Vigna, O.S.B. (died 1407) was a Roman Catholic prelate who served as Bishop of Todi (1405–1407) and Bishop of Ancona (1386–1405).

Biography
Guglielmo della Vigna was ordained a priest in the Order of Saint Benedict. On 6 February 1386, he was appointed during the papacy of Pope Urban VI as Bishop of Ancona. On 12 June 1405, he was appointed during the papacy of Pope Innocent VII as Bishop of Todi. He served as Bishop of Todi until his death on 28 October 1407. While bishop, he was the principal co-consecrator of Antonio Correr, Bishop of Modon (1407).

References

External links and additional sources
 (for Chronology of Bishops) 
 (for Chronology of Bishops) 

14th-century Italian Roman Catholic bishops
15th-century Italian Roman Catholic bishops
Bishops appointed by Pope Urban VI
Bishops appointed by Pope Innocent VII
1407 deaths
Benedictine bishops